Javier Torres (born, December 14, 1982)  is a ballet dancer from Cuba known for dancing for Ballet Nacional de Cuba and Northern Ballet.

Education 
Torres holds a BA Hons in Business Management and Leadership Practices  from The Open University-UK, (2020). He also holds a Master in Business Administration (MBA) from Cumbria University (2022).

Career 
Torres graduated with honours from the National Ballet School of Havana-Cuba as a ballet dancer and ballet teacher  in year 2000. The same year, he joined Ballet Nacional de Cuba under the artistic-technical guidance of Alicia Alonso. While dancing for  Ballet Nacional de Cuba, Torres was promoted to Principal Dancer in 2004 and Premier Dancer in 2009.
He  performed in  several countries across the Americas, Europe, and Asia. He worked with the ballet coaches Loipa Araujo, Josefina Mendez, Aurora Bosch, and Marta García.

Torres joined Northern Ballet in 2010 as Premier Dancer under the artistic guidance of David Nixon OBE. He has performed  in several events with the Company around the UK.

Torres is a One Dance UK member and a member of the International Dance Council (CID), UNESCO, and a Fellow of the Royal Society of Arts in the UK.

Torres' final performance with Northern Ballet in Kenneth Tindall's Casanova at Sadler's Wells Theatre was hold on Saturday 14 May 2022. He subsequently retired from dancing on the same day.

Post retirement career 
Torres is now the Managing Director of the Acosta Dance Centre & the "Acosta Dance Foundation". He is also the Business Operations Manager (Europe) at Sansha Group.

Awards and nominations 
 2002 - Won the Cuban Artists and Writers Union Villanueva Prize for his performance in the ballet Agon 

 2012 - Received the award Constructores de la Danza for his contribution to the Culture of the state of Ceará  in Brazil 

 2018 - Nominated for the Dancing Times Award for Best Male Dancer at the 19th National Dance Awards UK. 

 2019 - Nominated for the One Dance UK Dance personality of the year 

 2019 - Winner of the One Dance UK People’s Choice Awards 

 2020  - Winner of the One Dance UK People’s Choice Awards 

 2020 - Nominated for the One Dance UK Dance films Award

References

External links
 

Living people
Cuban male ballet dancers
1982 births
Cuban National Ballet dancers
Northern Ballet dancers